Salt River Township is an inactive township in Randolph County, in the U.S. state of Missouri.

Salt River Township takes its name from the nearby Salt River.

References

Townships in Missouri
Townships in Randolph County, Missouri